Ivan Mrkvička (born Jan Václav Mrkvička) (23 April 1856 – 16 May 1938) was a Czech-born painter and an active contributor to the artistic life of newly liberated Bulgaria in the late 19th and early 20th century. He is regarded as one of the founders of the modern Bulgarian fine art tradition.

Biography
Born in the village of Vidim near Mělník, he studied at the Academy of Fine Arts in Prague and the Munich Academy. Mrkvička came to Plovdiv in 1881 after an invitation by the then-Eastern Rumelian government and worked as a teacher in the Cyril and Methodius high school, where he co-operated with the most important cultural figures in the city — Ivan Vazov, Konstantin Velichkov, Petko Karavelov, Petko Slaveykov.

Mrkvička set up his first independent exhibition in 1886 and participated in two shared exhibitions with Anton Mitov, another teacher at the high school. During his Plovdiv period Mrkvička created some of his best known works: Plovdiv Marketplace (1883), Sakadzhii (1886), Gypsy Revelry (1887), Poulterer (1887), Marketplace in Plovdiv (1888) and others.

Mrkvička settled in Sofia in 1889 and was one of the founders of the National Academy of Arts in 1896, but briefly returned to Plovdiv in 1892 to take part in a special exhibition in the Plovdiv Fair main pavilion. He there presented 15 paintings, including Street in Plovdiv, and a sculpture called Bulgaria — Patroness of Agriculture and Crafts. He was also the author of the exhibition's official poster.

The painter's most significant achievements are in the everyday life genre, although he also worked in the historic painting sphere and is the author of many high-quality portraits. One of the creators of the then-coat of arms of Bulgaria and the coat of arms of Sofia, he became a Bulgarian Academy of Sciences member in 1918.

Mrkvička died in Prague on 16 May 1938.

Selected paintings

External links

1856 births
1938 deaths
Bulgarian painters
Bulgarian people of Czech descent
Corresponding Members of the Bulgarian Academy of Sciences
People from Mělník District
Academy of Fine Arts, Munich alumni
Academy of Fine Arts, Prague alumni
19th-century Czech painters
20th-century Czech painters
Czech male painters
19th-century Czech male artists
20th-century Czech male artists